= M-ligan =

- Sport: Floorball
- Founded: 1998
- Country: Sweden
- Venues: Fair Play Stadium, Malmö

M-ligan (Motionsligan) is a stand-alone floorball league in the city of Malmö, in the south of Sweden. It is primarily a league with non-licensed floorball players, but every game one licensed player on each team is allowed to participate. These rules don’t apply to goaltenders, which makes it legal for each team to use two licensed players every game (1 player and 1 goaltender).

The league rules are based on rules of the Swedish Floorball Federation (Svenska Innebandyförbundet), with a few local distinctions to adjust the game to the possibility of the league. One example is shortened game time.

== The history of M-ligan ==
M-ligan was established as a non-profit and stand-alone floorball league in the beginning of 1998 and the first season ended early spring, that year. In M-ligan, every year consists of two seasons, spring and fall season. The number of participating teams has grown over the years and today (fall of ’10) the league consists of five different divisions (div.1 – div 5.). In the ’10 fall season 37 different teams are participating in league play. Unfortunately vacancies exist this season, due to late withdrawal from a small number of teams.

Every season ends with qualifying games in lower divisions and a playoff in division one. The league winner gets an inscription on the trophy and the first team to win three times, gets the trophy and the league will provide a new one. Since the start in ’98 two trophies have been awarded and at the moment a couple of teams are fighting for the third and last inscription of the third trophy.

== Playing location ==
Since the start, the league play has always been located in Fair Play Stadium (Fair Play-stadion) in Malmö. The stadium has two courts with acceptable quality which has been a good foundation for the league over the years. When the league expanded some seasons ago, a third court was needed, and some games have since been played on Backahallen, a stadium located on the other side of the city. The owners of the Fair Play Stadium, decided in late August that a one-year-long re-build were to take place starting October 4, 2010 (later pushed forward to October 11). At the moment, there’s some uncertainty of where to play the upcoming two seasons, but hopefully an acceptable option is presented very soon, allowing league play to continue.

== The infamous guest book ==
The league site contains an infamous guest book, where harsh comments often are posted. The comments are often pointed towards specific teams, players or even referees. Those kinds of posts are always posted by anonymous Internet trolls. Not all the posts are bad and the guest book is also used by players and teams to communicate and to discuss things that concern the league.

== How to join the league ==
If you want to join the league, you have to contact the league board through the league page (in Swedish). Every team pays a member fee, a court rent fee and a small fee to the referees before a game’s started.
